Damian Ciechanowski (born 3 April 1996) is a Polish professional footballer who plays as a right-back for Unia Janikowo.

On 20 July 2013, he made his Ekstraklasa debut coming on as substitute in a match against Jagiellonia Białystok.

Honours

Zawisza Bydgoszcz
 Polish Cup: 2013–14

References

External links 
 
 
 

1996 births
Living people
Polish footballers
Poland youth international footballers
Association football defenders
Zawisza Bydgoszcz players
Olimpia Grudziądz players
OKS Stomil Olsztyn players
Unia Janikowo players
Ekstraklasa players
I liga players
II liga players
III liga players